Besana in Brianza is a town and commune in the province of Monza and Brianza, Lombardy, northern Italy. It received the honorary title of city with a presidential decree of 16 February 1971.

People
 Carlo Gnocchi (1902–1956), blessed
 Eugenio Corti (1921–2014), Italian writer
 Piero Corti (1925–2003), doctor
 Riccardo Muti (1941), honorary citizen
 Maddalena Crippa (1957), actress
 Demetrio Albertini (1971), footballer
 Vittorio Arrigoni (1975–2011), Italian reporter and activist

References 

Cities and towns in Lombardy
Populated places on Brianza